The 1920 Notre Dame Fighting Irish football team was an American football team that represented the University of Notre Dame as an independent during the 1920 college football season. In their third year under head coach Knute Rockne, the team compiled a perfect 9–0 record and outscored opponents by a total of 251 to 44. 

There was no contemporaneous system in 1919 for determining a national champion. However, Notre Dame was retroactively named as the national champion by the Billingsley Report and as a co-national champion by Parke H. Davis. 

Senior halfback George Gipp was a consensus pick on the 1920 All-America college football team. He died on December 14, 1920, due to a streptococcal throat infection and pneumonia. Other Notre Dame players who received 1920 All-America honors included: ends Eddie Anderson (first-team from United Press) and Roger Kiley (first-team from International News Service); and tackle Frank Coughlin (second-team from International News Service and Walter Eckersall).

Schedule

Personnel

Players

 Eddie Anderson, end
 Hunk Anderson
 Norman Barry
 Joe Brandy, quarterback
 Glen Carberry
 Paul Castner
 Fod Cotton
 Danny Coughlin, halfback
 Frank Coughlin, captain
 Edward DeGree
 James Dooley
 Art Garvey
 George Gipp, halfback
 Chet Grant
 Daniel Grant
 Dave Hayes, end
 Cy Kasper
 Roger Kiley, end
 Fred Larson
 Harry Mehre
 John Mohardt, halfback
 Eugene Oberst
 Bob Phelan
 Si Seyfrit
 Buck Shaw
 Maurice J. "Clipper" Smith, guard
 Frank Thomas
 William Voss
 Earl Walsh
 Chet A. Wynne, fullback

Coaching staff

 Knute Rockne, head coach
 Walter Halas, assistant coach
 Maurice Starrett, student manager

References

Notre Dame
Notre Dame Fighting Irish football seasons
College football undefeated seasons
Notre Dame Fighting Irish football